Jamie Ryan Paterson (born 26 April 1973) is a Scottish former professional footballer who played as a midfielder.

Career
Born in Dumfries, Paterson played for Halifax Town, Falkirk, Scunthorpe United, Doncaster Rovers and Barrow.

References

1973 births
Living people
Scottish footballers
Halifax Town A.F.C. players
Falkirk F.C. players
Scunthorpe United F.C. players
Doncaster Rovers F.C. players
Barrow A.F.C. players
English Football League players
National League (English football) players
Scottish Football League players
Association football midfielders
Footballers from Dumfries